The Master of the Annunciation to the Shepherds was an anonymous master active in Naples, around 1620-1640. The Master's body of work was first identified by August L Mayer in the 1920s and connected to a group of works depicting the Annunciation to the Shepherds, with notable examples in Birmingham Museum and Art Gallery and the Museo di Capodimonte, Naples.

Gallery

References

External links 

 
http://www.sothebys.com/en/auctions/ecatalogue/2013/old-master-paintings-n08952/lot.49.html
https://web.archive.org/web/20160304072426/http://www.nationalgallery.ie/en/Collection/Irelands_Favourite_Painting/Caravaggio/Final_Master_of_the_Annunciation.aspx

17th-century Italian painters
Painters from Naples
Annunciation to the Shepherds
Date of birth unknown
Date of death unknown